The A62 autoroute is a French motorway forming part of the Autoroute de Deux Mers (Two Seas Motorway). The entirety of the route forms the entirety of European route E 72, which is a part of the inter-European road system. The route of the A62 / E72 is between the cities of Bordeaux and Toulouse. The E72 was previously called E76 in 1975.

The road is the western portion of the Autoroute de Deux Mers connecting Toulouse (as an extension of the A61) with Bordeaux with a junction with the A630.  The road is a toll road for the majority of its course (free between Bordeaux and La Brède). It is operated by ASF.

The A62 / E72 is 2x2 lanes between Bordeaux and Montauban and was widened to 2x3 lanes between Montauban and Toulouse where it also carries the north–south traffic coming from A20.

Junctions

Exchange A630-A62 / E72
01 (Technopolis) km 7 Towns served: Martillac
01.1 (La Brède) km 12 Towns served: La Brède, Castres-Gironde
Péage de Saint Selve
Service Area: Les Landes
02 (Podensac) km 26 Towns served: Podensac, Cadillac and Sauternes
03 (Langon) km 37 Towns served: Langon
Rest Area: Auros
Service Area: Bazadais
04 (La Réole) km  55 Towns served: La Réole
Rest Area: Chant du Coucou
05 (Marmande) km 72 Towns served: Marmande
Rest Area: Mas d'Agenais
Service Area: Queyran
06 (Aiguillon) km 93 Towns served: Damazan and  Aiguillon
Rest Area: Buzet-sur-Baïse
Rest Area: Bruch
Service Area: Agen Porte d'Aquitaine
Rest Area: Estillac
07 (Agen) km 124 Towns served: Agen
Rest area: Moirax
Rest area: Layrac
Rest Area: Dunes
08 (Valence-d'Agen) km 149 Towns served: Valence, Auvillar (the most beautiful village in France ).
Rest area: Garonne
Rest Area: La Vallière/Savigny
09 (Castelsarrasin) km 169 Towns served: Castelsarrasin, Moissac
Rest area: Escatalens/Forêt de Saint-Porquier
Rest Area: Forêt de Montech/Lacourt-Saint-Pierre
10 (Montauban) km 193 Towns served: Montauban
Exchange A62-A20 Junction with the A20 to Limoges.
Rest Area: Naudy/se, Campsas sens Toulouse-Bordeaux
Service Area: Frontonnais
10.1 (Eurocentre) km 213 Towns served: Castelnau-d'Estrétefonds
11 (Lespinasse) km 219 Towns served:Lespinasse
Péage de Toulouse-nord
Exchange A62-A680 km 225 Motorway becomes the Périphérique de Toulouse serving Toulouse.
12 (Les Izards) km 226 Towns served:Toulouse
12 (Croix Daurade) km 228 Towns served:Toulouse
Exchange A62 / E 72-A68-A61  Motorway ends in a junction with the A61, A68

Route

 / : Toulouse Barcelone - Zaragoza

References

External links 
 UN Economic Commission for Europe: Overall Map of E-road Network (2007)
 A62 Motorway in Saratlas

A62
72
E072